Hunter's Mill Complex, also known as Rush's Mill, is a historic grist mill complex located on a rise above Perkiomen Creek in Hereford Township, Berks County, Pennsylvania.  The complex consists of a three-story mill built about 1792-1793; 2 1/2-story, five bay Federal style stone dwelling built in 1794, mid-19th century stone and frame Pennsylvania bank barn; two  1 1/2-story stone summer kitchens; and a late 18th-century stone walled garden. The mill measures 45 feet by 36 feet.  The house has a Georgian floor plan and measures 45 feet by 45 feet.

It was listed on the National Register of Historic Places in 1988.

References

Grinding mills in Berks County, Pennsylvania
Grinding mills on the National Register of Historic Places in Pennsylvania
Houses completed in 1794
Houses in Berks County, Pennsylvania
National Register of Historic Places in Berks County, Pennsylvania
1794 establishments in Pennsylvania